Derakht-e Tut (also Romanized as Derakht-e Tūt and Derakht Tūt) is a village in Salehabad Rural District, Salehabad County, Razavi Khorasan Province, Iran. At the 2006 census, its population was 453, in 94 families.

References 

Populated places in   Torbat-e Jam County